Zeineb Benzina, whose full name is Zeïneb Benzina Ben Abdallah, born in Tunis, Tunisia, is an archeologist, and director of research at the Institut national du patrimoine (in English: National Heritage Institute) based in Tunis.

She has authored or co-authored many research publications on ancient Tunisia and North Africa, and is an expert on Roman Africa, Carthage in particular.

She is the daughter of Dr. Tewhida Ben Sheikh, the first female physician in the Arab world.

External links
National Heritage Institute of Tunisia Website

References

Tunisian women archaeologists
Africa (Roman province)
Living people
Tunisian archaeologists
Year of birth missing (living people)